"Rosanna's Going Wild" is a song written by June, Helen and Anita Carter for Johnny Cash.

Cash released it as a single (Columbia 4-44373, with "Roll Call" on the opposite side) in November 1967. The song made it to number 2 on U.S. Billboards country chart and to number 91 on the Hot 100.

Years later the song was included on Johnny Cash's album International Superstar (1972).

Analysis 

The success was completely unexpected:

Track listing

Charts

References

External links 
 "Rosanna's Going Wild" on the Johnny Cash official website

Johnny Cash songs
1968 songs
1968 singles
Columbia Records singles
Songs written by June Carter Cash
Songs written by Helen Carter
Songs written by Anita Carter